Violdelphin is an anthocyanin, a plant pigment,  has been found in the purplish blue flower of Aconitum chinense, in the blue flowers in the genus Campanula and in the blue flowers of Delphinium hybridum. It is a flavenoid natural product,  incorporating two p-hydroxy benzoic acid residues, one rutinoside and two glucosides associated with a delphinidin.

References 

Anthocyanins